Karen Saxe is an American mathematician who specializes in functional analysis, and in the mathematical study of issues related to social justice. She is DeWitt Wallace Professor of Mathematics, Emerita at Macalester College,. She is Associate Executive Director of the American Mathematical Society and Director of its Office of Government Relations, based in Washington DC.

She is the author of Beginning Functional Analysis, published in the Springer Undergraduate Texts in Mathematics series in 2001.

Education and career
Saxe graduated from Bard College in 1982. She obtained her Ph.D. from the University of Oregon in 1988, with a dissertation on Fredholm theory supervised by Bruce Barnes.

She joined the Macalester faculty in 1991. She chaired the department of mathematics, statistics, and computer science at Macalester from 2007 to 2013, and was named DeWitt Wallace Professor in 2015.

She took part on a commission to redraw Minnesota's congressional districts in 2010, and has served as a science and technology advisor to Minnesota senator Al Franken.

Recognition
Saxe is the recipient of a Distinguished Teaching Award from the Mathematical Association of America. In 2017 she was given an honorary doctorate by Bard College.

References

External links
Home page
Capital Currents, Saxe's blog, published by the American Mathematical Society

Year of birth missing (living people)
Living people
20th-century American mathematicians
21st-century American mathematicians
American women mathematicians
Functional analysts
Bard College alumni
University of Oregon alumni
Macalester College faculty
20th-century women mathematicians
21st-century women mathematicians
20th-century American women
21st-century American women